Sriramavaram is a village in Eluru district of the Indian state of Andhra Pradesh. It is administered under of Eluru revenue division.

Demographics 

 Census of India, Sriramavaram has population of 2217 of which 1133 are males while 1084 are females. Average Sex Ratio is 957. Population of children with age 0-6 is 263 which makes up 11.86% of total population of village, Child sex ratio is 105. Literacy rate of the village was 71.19%.

References

Villages in Eluru district